Crash Test Dude: Brad Roberts Live Singing Your Favorite Hits is a live album performed by Crash Test Dummies lead singer Brad Roberts during his solo acoustic tour following the Give Yourself a Hand tour. The album was released, along with an accompanying rockumentary film, exclusively through the MapleMusic.com e-commerce portal.

Album

Track listing

Film

Crash Test Dude was also released as a rockumentary film.  The film features a candid, behind-the-scenes look at Brad Robert's solo tour across Canada and the Northern U.S.

Personnel 
Brad Roberts – lead vocals, acoustic guitar, bass baritone guitar
Murray Pulver – back-up vocals, acoustic guitar, electric guitar

Reception

The album received mixed to poor reviews.  Allmusic writer Aaron Badgley gave it 1½ out of 5 stars and states that "choosing to debut with a live disc was not a good idea, as this CD is full of Roberts' rants and childish cover versions. It is also the performance of an artist who does not seem to care a great deal about his audience. Sure, the Crash Test Dummies hits are here, in stripped-down, almost acoustic versions. And it is for those songs alone that CD even deserves a listen. The versions are nowhere near as good as the original studio recordings, but at least they have a form, are complete, and are listenable. His version of Britney Spears' Baby One More Time following a poem titled Circumcision is neither funny or ironic. It is plain pathetic. And his rants between songs are just the ramblings of a drunken performer (he makes it clear that he continues to drink throughout the show)."

References

External links
Crash Test Dude at MapleMusic.com
Crash Test Dude CD/Video set at MapleMusic.com

Canadian musical films
Brad Roberts albums
2001 live albums
Crash Test Dummies